Tom Alexander Rothe (born 29 October 2004) is a German professional footballer who plays as a left-back for Bundesliga club Borussia Dortmund.

Club career
Rothe joined Borussia Dortmund from St. Pauli in 2021. On 16 April 2022, he scored on his debut against Wolfsburg in a 6–1 win.

Career statistics

Club

References

External links
 Profile at the Borussia Dortmund website
 

2004 births
Living people
German footballers
Germany youth international footballers
Association football defenders
Bundesliga players
FC St. Pauli players
Borussia Dortmund players